This is a list of winners and nominees of the Golden Bell Award for Best Leading Actress in a Miniseries or Television Film.

Winners and nominees

2000s

2010s

2020s

References

Leading Actress in a Mini-series, Best
Television awards for Best Actress